Mihály Kincses (born 8 April 1918, in Budapest) was a Hungarian professional football player.

Honours
 Hungarian champion: 1942/43, 1943/44.
 Serie A champion: 1947/48.

1918 births
Year of death missing
Hungarian footballers
Hungary international footballers
Budapest Honvéd FC players
Hungarian expatriate footballers
Expatriate footballers in Italy
Serie A players
Serie B players
Atalanta B.C. players
Juventus F.C. players
S.S.C. Bari players
S.S.D. Lucchese 1905 players
U.S. Salernitana 1919 players
Association football midfielders
Footballers from Budapest